Gene Edward Veith (born October 15, 1951) is an author, scholar, and Professor of Literature emeritus at Patrick Henry College. He received his Ph.D. in English from the University of Kansas in 1979. Additionally, he holds honorary doctorates from Concordia Theological Seminary, Concordia University California, and Patrick Henry College.

Background
He served there as Dean of Academic Affairs and Provost, and was the culture editor of World magazine. He has written 20 books and over 100 scholarly works. Veith served previously on the faculty as Professor of English at Concordia University Wisconsin, as well as being the Dean of the School of Arts and Sciences and the director of the Cranach Institute.

Works
Authentic Christianity: How Lutheran Theology Speaks to a Postmodern World
Christianity in an Age of Terrorism
Christians in a .Com World: Getting Connected Without Being Consumed
Classical Education: The Movement Sweeping America
Classical Education: Towards The Revival of American Schooling
Family Vocation: God's Calling In Marriage, Parenting, And Childhood
The Gift of Art: The Place of the Arts in Scripture
God at Work: Your Christian Vocation in All of Life
Honky-Tonk Gospel: The Story of Sin and Salvation in Country Music
Imagination Redeemed: Glorifying God with a Neglected Part of Your Mind
Loving God With All Your Mind: Thinking as a Christian in a Postmodern World
Modern Fascism: Liquidating the Judeo-Christian Worldview
Modern Fascism: The Threat to the Judeo-Christian View
Fascism: Modern and Postmodern
Painters of Faith: The Spiritual Landscape in Nineteenth Century America
A Place to Stand
Post-Christian: A Guide to Contemporary Thought and Culture
Postmodern Times: A Christian Guide to Contemporary Thought and Culture
Reading Between the Lines
Reformation Spirituality: The Religion of George Herbert
The Soul of Prince Caspian: Exploring Spiritual Truth in the Land of Narnia
The Soul of the Lion, the Witch, & the Wardrobe
The Spirituality of the Cross
State of the Arts: Bezalel to Mapplethorpe

References 

1951 births
Concordia University Wisconsin faculty
Living people
Patrick Henry College faculty
American magazine editors